The Vishnu Nicolo Seal is a "finely engraved" oval agate seal (1.4 inches by 1.05 inch) from the Gandhara region, dated to the 4th century CE.  Since 1892 it has been in the British Museum.

The seal depicts a four-armed deity, probably Vishnu or Vāsudeva, being prayed by a royal devotee. The deity holds Vishnu's classical attributes: the gada club, the chakra discus, the wheel and the lotus.  There is a two-line inscription and a monogram by the worshipper's feet.

The British Museum describes the inscription as "Bactrian", transliterating it: "(1) saso reo iastoo (2) algo", translated as: "Sas-re(w) the leader of worship (?)".

It was found in what was then the North-West Frontier Province of British India, now Khyber Pakhtunkhwa of Pakistan.

Interpretations
The seal was first reported by Alexander Cunningham in The Numismatic Chonicle of 1893. Cunningham, saw in the devotee the Kushan emperor Huvishka, who reigned about 140-180 BC, based on the similarity of the headdress.

More recently Roman Ghirshman proposed that the text on the seal was in the Kushan script and mentions three major Hindu gods: 

A more recent interpretation suggests the divinity is Vāsudeva, an early deity whose attributes were later reused in the iconography of Vishnu with the addition of an aureole.

This recent research also identified the devotee, not with Huvishka, but with a Huna king. The devotee could also be a Kushano-Sasanian or a Kidarite prince. 

The seal also suggest that a composite cult of the three deities Surya (another name for Mihira, meaning "Sun"), Vishnu and Shiva was current in India circa 500 CE.  However, the British Museum in 2019 gives a different reading of the inscription.

Notes

References
 "BM": British Museum page

Further reading
Callieri, Seals and Sealing, 1997, Naples (p. 190)

Asian objects in the British Museum
Vaishnavism
Seals (insignia)
Individual hardstone carvings
Gupta art